Oleksandr Maksymchuk is a Ukrainian sprint canoer who has competed since the late 2000s. He won a silver medal in the C-1 4 × 200 m relay at the 2010 ICF Canoe Sprint World Championships in Poznań.

References
Men's C-1 4 x 200 m relay A final results. - accessed 22 August 2010.

Living people
Ukrainian male canoeists
Year of birth missing (living people)
ICF Canoe Sprint World Championships medalists in Canadian
21st-century Ukrainian people